Dear Mr. Prohack is a 1949 British comedy film directed by Thornton Freeland. It is a modern-day version of Arnold Bennett's 1922 novel, Mr Prohack, as adapted in the play by Edward Knoblock. It stars Cecil Parker, Glynis Johns and Dirk Bogarde.

Plot
Arthur Prohack, a Treasury civil servant who is extremely frugal with the government's money, suddenly inherits £250,000 and is convinced to go on six months' sick leave. His children Charles and Mary tap him for money for an investment scheme and a theatrical production respectively, whilst his wife Eve buys the family a far larger house, which she fills with an aviary and then aquariums. Charles also buys his father a new car, which on its first drive is involved in an accident with Mimi Warburton. Initially frosty, he takes her on as his private secretary. Charles cancels a meeting with Arthur and arranges a board meeting without him - in vengeance Mimi arranges for Arthur 'accidentally' to take Charles' place at a meeting with Lady Maslam, Charles' patroness. Left behind at home, Charles and Mimi lunch together and fall in love, leading her to try to tender her resignation, as on first taking the job with Arthur she had agreed not to fall in love with Charles.

Arthur's friend Sir Paul Spinner arranges to invest some of Arthur's money, whilst Eve arranges an elaborate party to celebrate Mary's engagement to Oswald Morfrey, a sickly but forthright junior official at the Ministry of Agriculture. However, breaking free of Mary's theatrical connections, the couple instead run away together and get married without their parents' knowledge - Arthur hunts them down but Oswald refuses his help. Soon afterwards Spinner informs Arthur that a run on the stock-market means all the money he invested may be lost. Mimi discovers that the investment scheme is also about to be ruined and argues with him at Lady Maslam's home, to which he had just gone to beg Lady Maslam's help.

Relieved he is about to be free of the troubles of his new fortune, Arthur retires to bed with a cold and has a fever dream inspired by Arthurian legends on the BBC Third Programme. Mimi wakes him to tell him that Charles has broken up with her and is about to flee to Paris with Lady Maslam, but when Arthur rushes to the airport this proves to be a misunderstanding - Charles has not boarded Lady Maslam's plane and returns home with Arthur to propose to Mimi. Arthur discovers that - although Spinner's advice has ruined Charles' scheme - Spinner has in fact managed to avoid the crash himself and make Arthur another £250,000. Arthur reconciles with Eve and makes plans to move back to their old house and help Oswald, Mary and Charles to more stable and healthy homes and jobs. He then returns to work and anonymously donates the new £250,000 to the Treasury under the guise of a massive repayment of back-taxes.

Cast
(in credits order)

 Cecil Parker as Arthur Prohack
 Glynis Johns as Mimi Warburton
 Hermione Baddeley as Eve Prohack
 Dirk Bogarde as Charles Prohack
 Sheila Sim as Mary Prohack
 Heather Thatcher as Lady Maslam
 Frances Waring as Nursie
 Charles Goldner as Polish Man Servant
 Campbell Cotts as Sir Paul Spinner
 Denholm Elliott as Oswald Morfrey
 Russell Waters as Cartwright
 Henry Edwards as Sir Digby Bunce
 Frederick Valk as Dr. Viega
 James Hayter as Carrell Quire
 Bryan Forbes as Tony
 Jon Pertwee as Plover
 Ada Reeve as Mrs. Griggs
 Judith Furse as Laura Postern
 Frederick Leister as The Director General
 Elwyn Brook-Jones as Benny Erivangian
 Eric Berry as Tailor's Assistant (uncredited)
 Janet Burnell as Mr. Prohack's personal assistant (uncredited)
 Ian Carmichael as Hat Salesman (uncredited)
 Anne Gunning as Actress (uncredited)
 Humphrey Heathcote as Turkish Bath Attendant (uncredited)
 Sam Lysons as Club Porter (uncredited)
 Desmond Newling as Pageboy (uncredited)
 Lloyd Pearson as Mr. Bishop (uncredited)
 Charles Perry as Butler (uncredited)
 Stanelli as Orchestra Leader (uncredited)
 Jerry Verno as Taxi Driver (uncredited)

Critical reception
The New York Times said, " it's an Arnold Bennett novel "modernized"—and it shows its age in this translation." 
TV Guide said, " Mediocre comedy with an excellent cast, including Denholm Elliott in his debut."
Britmovie wrote, "Cecil Parker gives one of his best performances replicating his stage role."

References

External links

1949 films
Films directed by Thornton Freeland
1949 comedy films
British comedy films
Films shot at Pinewood Studios
Films produced by Ian Dalrymple
Films with screenplays by Ian Dalrymple
Films set in London
Films based on works by Arnold Bennett
British black-and-white films
1940s English-language films
1940s British films